This article lists the longest passenger rail services that are currently scheduled and running directly between two cities. This list is not complete due to the complexity of various railway systems, their timetables and difference in schedule administration between countries. To keep the list simple, only services that are point-to-point direct between two cities are listed. Services that require railcar exchanges, coach changes, shunting or station transfers are not listed.

Top 50 train services, by distance

Longest train services, by country/region, within it 

Table below lists trains operating nationally, within a country.

Africa

Egypt

South Africa

Asia

China 
All services are operated by China Railway.

India

Indonesia

Japan

Russia

South Korea 

All services are operated by Korail.

Taiwan

Thailand

Vietnam

Europe

International services

Albania 
All services operated by Hekurudha Shqiptare

Belgium

Bulgaria

Czech Republic

Denmark

Finland

France

Germany

Ireland 
All services operated by Iarnród Éireann

Italy 

All services are operated by Trenitalia.

Liechtenstein

Luxembourg

Netherlands

Norway

Poland

Portugal

Romania

Russia 
Only services within geographical Europe (i.e. not into Siberia) are listed in this subcategory.

Slovakia

Spain 
All services operated by Renfe

Sweden

Switzerland

Ukraine

United Kingdom 

As of May 2021, this journey is only running on Saturdays following service cuts during the Coronavirus pandemic.

North America

Canada 

All services are operated by Via Rail.

United States 

All services are run by Amtrak.

South America

Argentina

Brazil

Oceania

Australia

New Zealand

Longest non-stop train services, by distance and country

Asia

China

India

Europe

Ireland

Sweden

North America

United States

Longest high-speed rail service
The China Railway G403/4, G405/6 and D939/40 Beijing-Kunming high-speed train (2,653 km, 10 hours 43 minutes to 14 hours 54 minutes), which began service on January 1, 2017, is the longest high-speed rail service in the world.

The previous record-holder was the likewise Chinese Beijing–Guangzhou–Shenzhen–Hong Kong high-speed railway at 2,230 km.

Eurostar previously held the record for its London to Cannes route, which set a record of 1,421 km non-stop high-speed service in 2006 (prior to the opening of High Speed One) – this was however not a regularly scheduled service. Currently, the record holders outside China are the Thalys service from Amsterdam to Marseille, at 1,265 km in 7 hrs, 15 mins, and the Eurostar from London to Marseille, at 1,215 km in 6 hrs, 26 mins.

References 

Passenger rail transport
Rail transport-related lists of superlatives